The Kameradschaftsbund (KB) was a Völkisch organization, founded in 1920s Czechoslovakia. It was a meeting ground of Sudeten German intellectuals, preparing them for taking up leadership roles in a possible future independent Sudetenland.

Walther Heinrich and Heinz Rutha were founders of the movement, and drew heavily on the theories of Othmar Spann. At the end of the 1920s, the movement became also political active; one of the strategies used was the infiltration of the Turnverband, by Konrad Henlein, one of the earliest KB members. Many Kameradschaftsbund members would later obtain top positions in the Sudetendeutsche Partei (SdP), under them Karl Hermann Frank and Walter Brand. After Rutha was charged with homosexual activity in 1937 (he later committed suicide), the KB gradually lost its influence on the SdP; Heinrich was sent to a concentration camp in 1938, and the SdP itself had to openly embrace German National Socialism.

References
 Haag, John. 'Knights of the Spirit': The Kameradschaftsbund. in Journal of Contemporary History, Vol. 8, No. 3 (Jul., 1973), pp. 133–153.

Organizations based in Czechoslovakia
1920s establishments in Czechoslovakia
Organizations established in the 1920s